The Vancouver version of the NWA World Tag Team Championship was a professional wrestling championship for tag teams that was used by NWA All-Star Wrestling from 1966 to 1968.  When the National Wrestling Alliance (NWA) was created in 1948, the Board of Directors decided to allow each NWA member to create its own local version of the NWA World Tag Team Championship. As it is a professional wrestling championship, it is not won or lost competitively, but instead is determined by the decision of the bookers of a wrestling promotion. The title is awarded after the chosen team "wins" a match to maintain the illusion that professional wrestling is a competitive sport.

The first team to hold the championship was the Tolos brothers (Chris Tolos and John Tolos). Records indicate that they were presented as champions in June 1966, but records are unclear on how they won the belts. The title was used for just under two years before being abandoned in favor of the NWA Canadian Tag Team Championship. The Tolos brothers and the team of Don Jardine and Dutch Savage were the only teams to hold the championship twice, and John Tolos the only wrestler to hold the championship three times. The Tolos brothers' second reign, from March 13 to October 3, 1967, is the longest at 203 days. Don Leo Jonathan and Dominic DeNucci held the title for just 21 days, the shortest confirmed reign of any champion.

Title history

Team reigns by combined length
Key

Individual reigns by combined length
Key

Footnotes

References

National Wrestling Alliance championships
Tag team wrestling championships
Professional wrestling in British Columbia